North Clackamas School District (NC12) serves more than 40 square miles and is located 7 miles from downtown Portland. Included are the incorporated cities of Milwaukie, Happy Valley, and Johnson City, parts of Damascus, and the neighborhoods of Oak Grove, Concord, Clackamas, Sunnyside, Mount Scott, Southgate, and Carver. The North Clackamas School District 12 spends $8,053 per pupil in current expenditures.  The district spends 59% on instruction, 38% on support services, and 4% on other elementary and secondary expenditures.

Demographics

The North Clackamas School District 12 had a grades 9-12 dropout rate of 4% in 2008. The national grades 9-12 dropout rate in 2007 was 4.4%. In the North Clackamas School District 12, 13% of students have an IEP (Individualized Education Program).  An IEP is a written plan for students eligible for special needs services. The North Clackamas School District 12 serves 14% English Language Learners (ELL). ELL students are in the process of acquiring and learning English Language skills.

Student enrollment

Student-teacher ratio
The North Clackamas School District 12 has 20 students for every full-time equivalent teacher, with the Oregon state average being 19 students per full-time equivalent teacher.

Student composite
Some students are in more than one category.

In the 2010-11 school year, the district had 344 students classified as homeless by the Department of Education, or 2% of students in the district.

List of schools

Elementary schools (K-5)

Ardenwald
Bilquist
Beatrice Morrow Cannady 
Verne Duncan
Happy Valley 
Seth Lewelling 
Linwood 
Milwaukie
Mount Scott
Oak Grove 
Oregon Trail
Riverside 
Scouters Mountain  
Spring Mountain
Sunnyside 
View Acres 
Lot Whitcomb

Magnet schools
Milwaukie El Puente (Bilingual Program)
Sojourner (Multiple Intelligences)
Riverside (Bilingual Program)

Middle schools (6-8)
Alder Creek Middle School
Happy Valley Middle School
Rock Creek Middle School
Wilber D. Rowe Middle School

High schools (9-12)
Clackamas High School 
Milwaukie High School 
Rex Putnam High School
New Urban High School
Adrienne C. Nelson High School

Professional technical center
Sabin-Schellenberg Center

High school programs
PACE (Parenting, Academics, Careers & Employment)

Charter schools
Cascade Heights Public Charter School (K-8)
Clackamas Middle College
Clackamas Web Academy (1-12)
Milwaukie Academy of the Arts

Closed schools
Milwaukie Junior High School (closed 2002)
Wichita Elementary School (closed 2010)
Campbell Elementary School (closed 2011)
Clackamas Elementary School (closed 2011)
Concord Elementary School (closed 2014)

School Board
The North Clackamas School District Board of Directors consists of seven local citizens, elected at large for four-year terms. The board's responsibility is to represent the community in giving direction and developing policies for the operation of the district, establishing educational goals and objectives, adopting a budget to carry out the programs of the district, and evaluating the programs of the district. The District Superintendent is Dr. Shay James.

The current board of directors consists of:

Libra Forde
Kathy Wai
Orlando Perez
Jena Beneloga, Vice Chair
Tory McVay
Mitzi Bauer, Chair
Steven Schroedl

Controversy
In late 2022, following disruptions of a board meeting by parents claiming reverse discrimination and accusing the district having a pro-LGBTQ bias, meetings were moved online. Board member Libra Forde stated that many parents no longer felt safe attending the meetings in person.

See also
List of school districts in Oregon

References

External links
North Clackamas School District (official website)
North Clackamas Schools Introduction Film
North Clackamas School District Education.com profile

School districts in Oregon
Education in Clackamas County, Oregon